The 37th Metro Manila Film Festival (MMFF) is the annual film festival in Manila, Philippines that is held from December 25, 2011 until the first week of January 2012. During the festival, no foreign films are shown in Philippine theaters in order to showcase locally produced films (except IMAX theaters).

The gangster movie Manila Kingpin: The Asiong Salonga Story reaped the most awards including the Best Picture, Best Director for Tikoy Aguiluz, at the 37th Metro Manila Film Festival "Gabi ng Parangal" on Wednesday night. "Asiong" is a remake of the 1961 film that starred former President Joseph Estrada. It is based on the life of a Tondo gangster in the 1950s, who was responsible for much crime but eluded capture using his wits and charm. The movie also won the Gatpuno Antonio J. Villegas Cultural Awards, which is given to a film that "embodies the values of Filipinos and the country’s heritage, history and culture".

Enteng ng Ina Mo, featuring the team-up comedians Vic Sotto and Ai Ai delas Alas, won the Second Best Picture award as well as this year's festival top-grosser, while the Shake, Rattle & Roll 13 directed by Chris Martinez, Jerrold Tarog and Richard Somes, received the Third Best Picture award.

This year's festival also started giving wider choices to viewers by showcasing independent films under the New Wave category (former named the "Indie Films").

Changes from previous years
In 2010, the film festival had undergone some changes. One change is that the festival format will give a tribute to independent "indie" films. For the first time in the 36 editions of the Metro Manila Film Festival, it paid tribute to the independent filmmakers in the country by featuring five indie films in addition to the eight mainstream movie entries in the 36th Metro Manila Film Festival.

In September 2011, Atty. Francis Tolentino, chairman of the Metropolitan Manila Development Authority (MMDA) changed the category name of "Indie" films to "New Wave" films to make it sound better and more attractive to hear, as well as including "Student Short Film Category" for the first time. The New Wave category starts during this year's festival.

Entries
Originally, there were eight mainstream films in the 2011 film festival. However, due to some issues, Hototay, which is supposedly the comeback movie of Nora Aunor, and Mr. Wong of Robin Padilla were pulled out of the festival. One of these spots will be filled in by the ninth movie, which did not make it earlier to the official list. This would be Manila Kingpin: The Untold Story of Asiong Salonga. Two films also submitted their scripts as their entries but did not make it to the official list. They are Spring Films' Kimmy Dora N D Temple of Kiyeme and Star Cinema's Love Will Lead You Back.

Official entries

New Wave entries
For the second time in the 37 editions of the Metro Manila Film Festival, it paid tribute to the independent filmmakers in the country by featuring fourteen "Indie films" under the New Wave category in addition to the seven mainstream movie entries in the MMFF. These films were exhibited from December 17 to 21, 2011.
 Dyagwar - Ogie Diaz and Sid Pascua
 Haruo - Adolfo Alix, Jr.
 HIV - Neil Tan
 Pintakasi - Nelson Caguila
 Ritwal - Yeng Grande

Student shorts
 Adivino - Emil Joson, Asia Pacific Film Institute
 Bagong Ligo - Aj Triviño, Mapua Institute of Technology
 Biyahe ni Barbie - Kookai Labayen, De La Salle-College of Saint Benilde
 I See Everything - Michael Jianoran, Southville International School and Colleges
 Mate - John Christian Nicolas, Colegio de San Juan de Letran
 Oras - Paula Manginsay, International Academy of Film and Television, Cebu
 Ang Payaso at ang Prinsesa - Kris Ann de la Peña, De La Salle Lipa
 Sanayan Lang ang Pagpatay - Gil Joseph Sanchez, Ateneo de Naga University
 Speechless - Rinei Ledina, Miriam College
 Ulan - Lito Casaje, Pixel Art and La Consolacion College Manila

Awards

On December 28, 2011 at Newport Performing Arts Theater, Resorts World Manila in Pasay, the Metro Manila Film Festival Awards Night was held. The awards night was aired on ABS-CBN on January 1, 2012.

Winners are listed first and highlighted in boldface.

Major awards

New Wave category

Special awards

Multiple awards

Mainstream films with multiple awards

Indie films with multiple awards

Ceremony Information
Manila Kingpin: The Asiong Salonga Story film got the most awards including the Best Picture. ER Ejercito states: "This film has gone through a lot...We didn't even think we'd be included in the festival lineup..."

On the other hand, Eugene Domingo was adjudged Best Supporting Actress for the comedy My House Husband: Ikaw Na! directed by Jose Javier Reyes. She dedicated her trophy to the film's lead actors and real-life couple Judy Ann Santos and Ryan Agoncillo. The film, about a man forced to take care of the household and two kids after he lost his bank manager job, also won the Gender Sensitivity award, which is given to a film that "respects the many aspects of an individual without bias, especially on the topic of sex".

Dingdong Dantes, who was named Best Actor for his performance in the Joyce Bernal suspense-thriller Segunda Mano, which Dantes also co-produced, did not attend the awards show. In the same way, Maricel Soriano who was heralded as Best Actress for her work in the Jun Lana family drama Yesterday, Today and Tomorrow, was also not there. During the giving of the Posthumous Award for Excellence, Iza Calzado represented the recipient director/choreographer Lito Calzado, and accepted the award.

Along with the mainstream films, furthermore, the independent films are given awards under the New Wave category. In 2010, the MMFF began showcasing independent films to give viewers wider choices. This year, the animated film Pintakasi won for Best Full-Length Film under this section. Ilocos Norte Gov. Imee Marcos who produced Pintakasi said it took her team, Creative Media Society of the Philippines, or CreaM, four years to make it. She states: "I salute those who support original Filipino animation, music and content".

Yesterday, Today, Tomorrow film disqualification for some awards
Yesterday, Today and Tomorrow, a Regal Entertainment production, was disqualified from four categories — Best Picture, Best Director, Best Screenplay and the Gatpuno Antonio J. Villegas Cultural Awards — for "deviating from the pre-approved story line", MMFF executive committee chair Francis Tolentino had earlier said.
Tolentino is also chair of the Metro Manila Development Authority, which hosts the annual ceremony. On the morning of Dec. 28, consequently, Regal matriarch Lily Monteverde and director Lana met with some executive committee members to try and convince them to reconsider their decision. Nevertheless, the committee denied Regal’s appeal.

Inclusion of Aguiluz' name
The heralded Best Picture Manila Kingpin: The Asiong Salonga Story, also wins the Best Director award for Tikoy Aguiluz, who was not around to receive his trophy. However, Aguiluz had protested the inclusion of his name in the film's credits and promotional materials. He said "Asiong" had been reshot, reedited and rescored without his knowledge, therefore, it could not be attributed to him.

On Dec. 20, Aguiluz filed a complaint in the Intellectual Property Rights Office against producer Maylyn Villalon of Scenema Concept International for infringement of Republic Act No. 8293, the Intellectual Property Code of the Philippines. Aguiluz further accused the producers of "violating" his rights as the film's director.

At the award ceremony held at the Newport Performing Arts Theater of Resorts World in Pasay, it was "Asiong" associate director Gary dela Cruz's name that was called out as Best Director. However, lead actor Laguna Gov. ER Ejercito said that he (dela Cruz) was accepting the trophy on behalf of Aguiluz. He says in his acceptance speech: "Direk Tikoy worked hard for this film. He labored for nine months, for 40 shooting days …". Je adds: "You're one of the best and brightest directors in the country. Pasensya ka na. (Forgive us). There were decisions the producers had to make to improve the film..." as he addressed the absent Aguiluz.

Mark Meily, a director and committee member states: "They (MMFF executive committee) just had to put in a name for director, but for all intents and purposes it was Tikoy who directed the film".

Reception
The film festival lasted from December 25, 2011 through January 7, 2012. According to Philippine Entertainment Portal, the list is the ranking of the films based on their official gross receipts as of the final day of the festival, January 7, 2012. Enteng ng Ina Mo broke MMFF box office records, having a total gross of P237,879,178.70. In addition, the film becomes the third Filipino film of 2011 to surpass the P200 million mark behind the box-office success of The Unkabogable Praybeyt Benjamin and No Other Woman as well as being the third highest grossing Filipino film of all time. Coming in second place is Segunda Mano, who surpassed Ang Panday 2 in the box office race. The top two films were co-produced by Star Cinema.

Box Office gross

References

External links

Metro Manila Film Festival
MMFF
MMFF
MMFF
MMFF
MMFF